Qasemabad-e Cheshmeh Barqi (also Romanized as Qāsemābād-e Cheshmeh Barqī; also known as Qāsemābād) is a village in Qaleh-ye Mozaffari Rural District, in the Central District of Selseleh County, Lorestan Province, Iran. At the 2006 census, its population was 101, in 16 families.

References 

Towns and villages in Selseleh County